Akyar may refer to:
 Akyar, Turkish name of Strovilia, a village in Northern Cyprus
 Akyar, Turkish name of Sevastopol, a major city in Crimea
 Akyar, Russia, several rural localities in Russia
 Akyar, Bigadiç, a populated place in Balıkesir Province, Turkey
 Akyar, Gercüş, a village in Batman Province, Turkey
 Akyar, Korkuteli, a village in Antalya Province, Turkey
 Akyar, Osmaniye, a populated place in Osmaniye Province, Turkey
 Akyar, Tavas, a populated place in Denizli Province, Turkey
 Akyar Dam, a dam in Ankara Province, Turkey, built between 1996 and 2001